The Tōtara River is a river of the northern West Coast Region of New Zealand's South Island. It rises near Mount Kelvin in the Paparoa Range and flows northwest to reach the Tasman Sea 10 kilometres south of Cape Foulwind. The Little Totara River joins the Tōtara just before it reaches the sea.

References

Rivers of the West Coast, New Zealand
Buller District
Rivers of New Zealand